Höllenbach is a small river of Bavaria, Germany. It is a left tributary of the Kahl in Schöllkrippen.

See also
List of rivers of Bavaria

Rivers of Bavaria
Rivers of the Spessart
Rivers of Germany